Georgia Yeoman-Dale (born 24 February 1994) is an Australian soccer player, who last played for Western Sydney Wanderers in the Australian W-League.

Club career

Canberra United
Yeoman-Dale started her professional career at Canberra United.

Newcastle Jets
Ahead of the 2014 season, Yeoman-Dale signed with Newcastle Jets.

Sydney FC
On 13 September 2016, Sydney FC announced their squad for the 2016–17 season, including Yeoman-Dale.

Western Sydney Wanderers
On 23 August 2018 Yeoman-Dale signed with the Western Sydney Wanderers for the 2018-19 W-League Season. She was one of several players who made the switch from Sydney FC to rivals Western Sydney. Yeoman-Dale departed Western Sydney Wanderers ahead of the 2021–22 A-League Women season.

International career
Yeoman-Dale made her debut for Australia in 2012. She most recently received a call-up to the Matildas squad in August 2017, for a pair of friendlies against Brazil.

References

1994 births
Living people
Australian women's soccer players
Canberra United FC players
Newcastle Jets FC (A-League Women) players
Sydney FC (A-League Women) players
Western Sydney Wanderers FC (A-League Women) players
A-League Women players
Sportspeople from Canberra
Soccer players from the Australian Capital Territory
Women's association football fullbacks
Women's association football midfielders